The discography of Das EFX consists of six studio albums, one compilation albums and nine singles.

Albums

Studio albums

Compilation album

Singles

References

Hip hop discographies
Discographies of American artists